Beraba decora is a species of beetle in the family Cerambycidae. It was described by Zajciw in 1961.

References

Beraba
Beetles described in 1961